Michelle Lynn Shupack, better known as Michelle Visage (born September 20, 1968), is an American singer, television host, actress, radio DJ and producer. She first gained recognition as a member of the musical group Seduction which charted five singles on the Billboard Hot 100. She later served as lead vocalist of another group The S.O.U.L. S.Y.S.T.E.M. which reached the top of the dance charts with the single "It's Gonna Be a Lovely Day" in 1993. In 2011, she joined the American reality competition series RuPaul's Drag Race, and has served as a permanent judge since season three. She is also a permanent judge on RuPaul's Drag Race All Stars, RuPaul's Drag Race UK, and RuPaul's Drag Race Down Under. Visage has won 3 Primetime Emmy Awards as a producer of RuPaul's Drag Race.

Early life
Visage grew up in New Jersey. She was adopted and was aware of this from an early age. Visage, adopted by two Jewish parents, was raised Jewish. Her biological father was also Jewish, while her biological mother was Irish and Italian Catholic.  Despite living in a lower middle class town without many Jewish people, her parents worked to make sure she could attend Hebrew school and have a Bat Mitzvah. She attended South Plainfield High School in South Plainfield, New Jersey, graduating in 1986. When Visage was 16, she won a Madonna lookalike competition. She then moved to New York and attended the American Musical and Dramatic Academy in Manhattan for two years. Growing up, Visage looked up to Madonna, Belinda Carlisle, Pat Benatar, Stevie Nicks, Cyndi Lauper and Dale Bozzio. Visage's mother died when she was 30. After finishing her studies she stayed in New York City to pursue a career as an actress.

In New York she was active in the club scene, her mother Arlene gave her a fake ID so she could make connections to help further her career. Visage became prominent in the New York drag ball scene and learned voguing from various people including Willi Ninja. She also became involved with Cesar Valentino and the pair appeared voguing together on the television show The Latin Connection in 1988, which they said was the first time voguing had appeared on national TV.

Michelle adopted her surname, Visage, after gaining the nickname "cara" ("face" in Spanish) from the people she spent time with in the New York ball scene. However, because people pronounced it incorrectly she decided to change it to "visage" ("face" in French - a language she studied during middle and high school), a name she has stuck with. Visage also met her future friend and co-star RuPaul for the first time in the late 1980s, when she attended club nights and parties hosted by Susanne Bartsch. In 1989, Visage performed at "The Love Ball", which was organized by Bartsch as a benefit for the Design Industries Foundation For AIDS. It is said that The Love Ball is where Madonna first witnessed voguing, the inspiration for her song "Vogue". During the day she worked as a receptionist at the shop Casablanca and Fundamental Things in the New York garment district.

Career

Music recording and music videos
Visage auditioned and won a place for Seduction, an R&B and dance vocal trio assembled by Robert Clivilles and David Cole that signed with A&M Records in 1990. The group had several hits, the most famous being "Two to Make It Right". After the group's breakup, Visage collaborated with the freestyle dance act TKA as a guest vocalist on the song "Crash (Have Some Fun)". Visage provided lead vocals and was the recording artist of another dance act assembled by Clivilles and Cole, The S.O.U.L. S.Y.S.T.E.M. The song "It's Gonna Be a Lovely Day", which was a cover version of the Bill Withers song "Lovely Day", was included on the soundtrack to The Bodyguard. "It's Gonna Be a Lovely Day" became a number-one dance single and peaked at number 34 on the Billboard Hot 100 in January 1993.

Visage has also been featured on several of RuPaul's music albums, and appears in the music videos for "New York City Beat"  and "From Your Heart", which originally premiered on RuPaul's Green Screen Christmas Special (2015), and were later uploaded to World of Wonder's YouTube channel. Visage has also made guest appearances in the videos for RuPaul's songs "Glamazon", "Responsitrannity", "The Beginning" and "Nothing for Christmas".

In February 2021, it was confirmed that Visage had teamed up with Steps on a reworked version of "Heartbreak In This City".

Radio and podcasts
Visage was the co-host of the morning show on WKTU in NYC from 1996 to 2002 where she and co-host RuPaul started working together professionally. When RuPaul left radio, Visage continued on to many morning shows including: Hot 92 Jamz (KHHT) in Los Angeles between 2002 and 2005. In 2005, Visage returned to New York City, where she served as co-host of The Morning Mix on WNEW-FM until December 2006. She also hosted on Sirius Satellite Radio's The Beat 66 from 2003 to 2006  On March 12, 2007, she became a co-host of the morning show on SUNNY 104.3 in West Palm Beach, Florida. On January 10, 2011, she joined 93.9 MIA in Miami as the host of the new MIA Morning Show. She left Miami and MIA in December 2011, moving back to Los Angeles.

Visage started co-hosting the weekly podcast RuPaul: What's the Tee? on April 9, 2014. The pair interview celebrities and discuss many topics ranging from their personal lives to RuPaul's Drag Race. The podcast won a 2018 Webby Award. Visage also presented Michelle Visage's Fabulous Divas on BBC Radio 2, with episodes broadcast in December 2019 and August 2020. In October and November 2020, she covered for Rylan Clark-Neal on his BBC Radio 2 show and in February 2022 she covered for Dermot O'Leary on his Saturday weekend breakfast show. As of 15 July 2022, she has begun presenting her own show each Friday night from 7 until 9pm on BBC Radio 2.

Television

Visage has worked with RuPaul on a variety of television shows throughout her career. In 1996, she became the co-host of RuPaul's VH1 talk show The RuPaul Show. She also co-hosted WKTU's morning show with RuPaul from 1996 to 2002. When RuPaul began casting judges for season one of RuPaul's Drag Race, he invited Visage to become a permanent member of the show. At the time she was on a five-year contract with a CBS radio station in West Palm Beach; after asking her boss if she could join the show he said no, which Visage put down to the show's links with the LGBT community.

RuPaul's Drag Race 
Two years later, Visage was contacted again by RuPaul and invited to appear on season three of the show. After her boss once again said she was not able to appear, she was persuaded by her friend Leah Remini to contact CBS officials who allowed her to join the show as a judge. On January 24, 2011, Visage debuted as a permanent judge, along with Santino Rice and Billy B, on season three of RuPaul's Drag Race, replacing Merle Ginsberg. She has also appeared on all seven seasons of the spin-off show, RuPaul's Drag Race All Stars.

In 2019, she received her first Primetime Emmy Award for Outstanding Competition Program, having been a producer of Drag Race since its eleventh season. That same year, she became a judge on RuPaul's Drag Race UK, which airs on BBC Three. In 2021, Visage served as a judge on RuPaul's Drag Race Down Under.

Other appearances 
On January 7, 2015, Visage became one of the contestants on the fifteenth series of the British reality series Celebrity Big Brother on Channel 5. On February 6, 2015, Visage left the house in fifth place. Since leaving the house she has appeared on some episodes of Celebrity Big Brother's Bit on the Side, a companion show that airs straight after Celebrity Big Brother.

Visage has made several other TV appearances including hosting VH1's red carpet coverage of the 1998 Grammys and in 2002, Grease 25th-anniversary re-release party. On May 13, 2017, she and Ross Mathews were the commentators for Logo TV's coverage of the Live Grand Final of the Eurovision Song Contest. More recently she has appeared as a judge on the first two seasons of Ireland's Got Talent, the first of which began airing on TV3 in February 2018. And in 2020, Visage joined fellow Ireland's Got Talent judge Louis Walsh on the judging panel of teen recycled-fashion competition Junk Kouture. She appeared on the televised Grand Final in February 2021, after the plans for the original live Grand Final were scuppered by COVID-19.

Strictly Come Dancing 
On August 5, 2019, it was announced that Visage would be taking part in the seventeenth series of Strictly Come Dancing in the UK on BBC. On September 7, it was confirmed that she was partnered with Giovanni Pernice.

 
Green number indicates Michelle & Giovanni were at the top of the leaderboard.
Red number indicates Michelle & Giovanni were at the bottom of the leaderboard.

Theater
Visage performed in her West End debut as "Miss Hedge" in Everybody's Talking About Jamie between October 18, 2018, and January 26, 2019.

Personal life
In her early years, Visage suffered from anorexia, an eating disorder which she says began when she was around 13 years old and continued into her adult life. Visage is vegan.

She lives in California with her husband, David Case, and her two daughters. On November 10, 2015, she published her first book, The Diva Rules.

On Episode 214 of What's the Tee?, her podcast with RuPaul, Visage said that as an adult, she has had sex with both men and women. "I've been with women; I've had sex with women... But I realized I never wanted to have a relationship [with them]."

In April 2019, Visage revealed she had Hashimoto's disease, which led to getting her trademark breast implants removed.

Discography

Albums

Singles

Guest appearances

Filmography

Awards and nominations

Notes

See also
 List of Celebrity Big Brother (British TV series) housemates
 List of Strictly Come Dancing contestants

References

External links

 
 Radio Resume
 
 
 RuPaul: What's The Tee? With Michelle Visage
 Michelle Visage (BBC Radio 2)
 Michelle Visage's Rule Breakers (BBC Radio 2)

1968 births
Living people
American women television personalities
American television personalities
American adoptees
American contemporary R&B singers
American women singers
American radio personalities
BBC Radio 2 presenters
American LGBT rights activists
People from South Plainfield, New Jersey
Primetime Emmy Award winners
Singers from New Jersey
Women civil rights activists
21st-century American women
American Musical and Dramatic Academy alumni
RuPaul's Drag Race
RuPaul's Drag Race Down Under
RuPaul's Drag Race UK
Judges in American reality television series